Aija Andrejeva (born 16 January 1986 in Ogre, Latvia), better known by her stage name Aisha, is a Latvian singer.

Eurovision Song Contest 2010
On 27 February 2010, Aija Andrejeva won the Latvian national final Eirodziesma 2010, and has represented Latvia in the Eurovision Song Contest 2010 in Oslo, Norway, with the song What For?.

Andrejeva failed to qualify to the final from the first semifinal on 25 May, coming in last place.

The following year, she presented the Latvian votes.

Discography
Tu un Es (2006)
Viss kārtībā, Mincīt! (2008)
Dvēselīte (2009)
Mazais princis (2016)

References

External links

 Aisha's Fan Site
 Aisha's unofficial forum

1986 births
Eurovision Song Contest entrants of 2010
Eurovision Song Contest entrants for Latvia
Latvian child singers
21st-century Latvian women singers
Latvian people of Russian descent
Living people
People from Ogre, Latvia
Latvian pop singers